John of Bourbon (1381–1434) was Duke of Bourbon, from 1410 to his death and Duke of Auvergne since 1416. He was the eldest son of Louis II and Anne of Auvergne. Through his mother, John inherited the County of Forez.

During the Armagnac–Burgundian Civil War he took sides against the Burgundians. John was captured at the Battle of Agincourt and died a prisoner in London, in spite of the payment of several ransoms, and promises to support the king of England as king of France.

In 1400 in Paris, he married Marie, Duchess of Auvergne, daughter of John, Duke of Berry, who inherited the Auvergne title from her father. They had three sons:

 Charles de Bourbon (1401–1456), Duke of Bourbon
 Louis of Bourbon (1403–1412, Paris), Count of Forez
 Louis de Bourbon (1405–1486), Count of Montpensier

In addition, he had two illegitimate children:

 Margaret, married to Rodrigo de Villandrando.
 John, bishop of Puy

Notes

References

Sources

House of Bourbon (France)
Dukes of Bourbon
Dukes of Auvergne
Counts of Clermont-en-Beauvaisis
Counts of Montpensier
Counts of Forez
Counts of Isle-Jourdain
1381 births
1434 deaths
French prisoners of war in the Hundred Years' War
15th-century peers of France
People of the Hundred Years' War
House of Bourbon-Montpensier